Iong Kim Fai (born 12 January 1989) is a Macanese athlete specialising in the 110 metres hurdles. He represented his country at two outdoor and two indoor World Championships.

He has personal bests of 14.23 seconds in the 110 metres hurdles and 8.34 seconds in the 60 metres hurdles (both set in 2014). Both are current national records.

Competition record

References

1989 births
Living people
Macau male sprinters
Athletes (track and field) at the 2010 Asian Games
Athletes (track and field) at the 2014 Asian Games
Macau male hurdlers
World Athletics Championships athletes for Macau
Asian Games competitors for Macau
Competitors at the 2011 Summer Universiade